In optical physics, laser detuning is the tuning of a laser to a frequency that is slightly off from a quantum system's resonant frequency. When used as a noun, the laser detuning is the difference between the resonance frequency of the system and the laser's optical frequency (or wavelength). Lasers tuned to a frequency below the resonant frequency are called red-detuned, and lasers tuned above resonance are called blue-detuned.

Illustration
Consider a system with a resonance frequency  in the optical frequency range of the electromagnetic spectrum, i.e. with frequency of a few THz to a few PHz, or equivalently with a wavelength in the range of 10 nm to 100 μm. If this system is excited by a laser with a frequency  close to this value, the laser detuning is then defined as:The most common examples of such resonant systems in the optical frequency range are optical cavities (free-space, fiber or microcavities), atoms, and dielectrics or semiconductors. 

The laser detuning is important for a resonant system such as a cavity because it determines the phase (modulo 2π) acquired by the laser field per roundtrip. This is important for linear optical processes such as interference and scattering, and extremely important for nonlinear optical processes because it affects the phase-matching condition.

Applications

Laser cooling of atoms 

Lasers can be detuned in the lab frame so that they are Doppler shifted to the resonant frequency in a moving system, which allows lasers to affect only atoms moving at a specific speed or in a specific direction and makes laser detuning a central tool of laser cooling and magneto-optical traps.

Optomechanics 

Similar to the laser cooling of atoms, the sign of the detuning plays an important part in Optomechanical applications. In the red detuned regime, the optomechanical system undergoes cooling and coherent energy transfer between the light and the mechanical mode (a "beam splitter"). In the blue-detuned regime, it undergoes heating, mechanical amplification and possibly squeezing and entanglement. The on-resonance case when the laser detuning is zero, can be used for very sensitive detection of mechanical motion, such as used in LIGO.

References 

Detuning